Greg Jenkins (born August 23, 1989) is a former American football wide receiver. He signed with the Oakland Raiders as an undrafted free agent immediately following the conclusion of the 2013 NFL Draft. He played college football at Alabama State as a quarterback. He has also been a member of the Jacksonville Jaguars and Hamilton Tiger-Cats (CFL).

College career 
Jenkins played college football for Alabama State. While with the Hornets he played quarterback. In his senior year he threw for 1,691 yards, nine touchdowns, and ten interceptions while also rushing for 507 yards and eight touchdowns.

Professional career

Oakland Raiders
Jenkins signed by Raiders as undrafted free agent on May 13, 2013. On November 23, 2013, he was promoted from the practice squad. On November 28, 2013 against the Dallas Cowboys in which he scored a fumble return touchdown on the opening kickoff. The Raiders waived/injured Jenkins on August 26, 2014.

Jacksonville Jaguars
Jenkins was signed by the Jaguars on July 24, 2015. He was released on an injury settlement by the Jaguars on September 2, 2015 in order to make room for Connor Hamlett to add tight end depth after an injury to starter Julius Thomas.

Hamilton Tiger-Cats 
Greg Jenkins spent part of the 2017 CFL off-season trying to make the roster for the Hamilton Tiger-Cats (CFL) before being released on May 1, 2017 as teams trimmed their rosters down to 75 players.

References

External links
Jacksonville Jaguars bio
Alabama State Hornets bio

1989 births
Living people
American football wide receivers
Alabama State Hornets football players
Jacksonville Jaguars players